The  plum-colored worm lizard (Amphisbaena prunicolor) is a worm lizard species in the family Amphisbaenidae. It is found in Argentina, Brazil, and Paraguay.

References

Amphisbaena (lizard)
Reptiles described in 1885
Taxa named by Edward Drinker Cope